Manana Doijashvili, OSI (5 November 1947 – 17 January 2023) was a Georgian pianist and professor of piano.

She was trained at the Tbilisi State Conservatory under Tengiz Amirejibi. She won prizes at the 1970 Enescu (Bucharest) and the 1974 Smetana (Plzeň) competitions, and ranked 6th at the inaugural edition of the Sydney Competition.

From 2000 to 2012, Doijashvili was the rector of the Tbilisi State Conservatory, and the founder of the Tbilisi International Piano Competition. She had been named a People's Artist of Georgia was awarded the Order of the Star of Italy in 2010. She had been awarded the Zakharia Paliashvili prize (2003) and the Russian Performing Art Fund prize (2004).

Doijashvili served on the Jury of numerous other piano competitions, including the Aram Khachaturian competition, the Rhodes international piano competition, the Sydney competition, the Busoni competition, and the Horovitz competition.

Doijashvili died on 17 January 2023, at the age of 75.

References

External links
 
 

1947 births
2023 deaths
Classical pianists from Georgia (country)
Women pianists from Georgia (country)
Women classical pianists
Chevaliers of the Ordre des Arts et des Lettres
Sydney International Piano Competition prize-winners
21st-century classical pianists
21st-century women pianists
20th-century classical pianists
20th-century women pianists
Tbilisi State Conservatoire alumni
20th-century musicians from Georgia (country)
21st-century musicians from Georgia (country)
People's Artists of Georgia